Bryan E. Burns (born June 25, 1970) is an American archaeologist. He is a professor of Classical Studies at Wellesley College and co-director of the Eastern Boeotia Archaeological Project. His thesis turned book Mycenaean Greece, Mediterranean Commerce, and the Formation of Identity received the 2014 James R. Wiseman Book Award from the Archaeological Institute of America.

Early life and education
Burns was born on June 25, 1970, in Florida. He earned his Bachelor of Arts degree from the University of North Carolina and his Master's degree and PhD from the University of Michigan.

Career
Upon earning his PhD in Classical art and archaeology, Burns joined the faculty at the University of Southern California until 2008 when he accepted a position at Wellesley College. Within his first few years at Wellesley, Burns earned a fellowship at Harvard University's Center for Hellenic Studies. He also published his first book, a reimagination of his thesis titled Mycenaean Greece, Mediterranean Commerce, and the Formation of Identity which focused on the perception, formation, and development of Mycenaean identity. The book later earned the 2014 James R. Wiseman Book Award from the Archaeological Institute of America. 

As co-director of the Eastern Boeotia Archaeological Project, Burns also spent his summer with students excavating a Bronze Age settlement in Greece. In July 2014, Burns took five North American female students to Greece as part of an international team of 50 scholars and students that participated in a six weeks excavation project at Eleon.

References

Living people
1970 births
University of Southern California faculty
Wellesley College faculty
University of Michigan alumni
American archaeologists
Academics from Florida
University of North Carolina alumni